Soğanlı may refer to the following places in Turkey:

 Soğanlı, Ardanuç
 Soğanlı, Burdur
 Soğanlı, Kovancılar
 Soğanlı, Sason
 Soğanlı, Sur
 Soğanlı railway station
 Soğanlı Valley